The House of Artois was a cadet branch of the Capetian dynasty, descended from Louis VIII the Lion, King of France, through his younger son, Robert (1216 † 1250). Robert received the County of Artois as appanage in his father's will.

In 1297, Robert II, Count of Artois, was one of three Capetian princes to be added to the peerage of France. On his death in 1302, the county was claimed by his daughter Mahaut and his paternal grandson Robert III. The Parlement of Paris ruled in favor of Mahaut, and Robert III was given the lordship of Beaumont-le-Roger as compensation.

Robert later lost his lands by producing false documents in support of his claims in the Artois suit. The county of Artois was inherited by Mahaut's descendants, who married into the House of Burgundy, another branch of the Capetian dynasty.

The sons of Robert III received French titles and fought in the Hundred Years War against the English. The House of Artois became extinct in the male line in 1472.

Family tree

References

 
Artois